Mixed Blood is a 1916 Western film directed by Charles Swickard, and starring Claire McDowell. It is not known whether the film currently survives.

Cast
 Claire McDowell as Nita Valyez
 George Beranger as Carlos
 Roy Stewart as Big Jim
 Wilbur Higby as Joe Nagle
 Jessie Arnold as Lottie Nagle
 Harry Archer as Blootch White

References

External links
 

1916 films
1916 Western (genre) films
American black-and-white films
Silent American Western (genre) films
1910s American films